Faisalabad Electric Supply Company (FESCO) is an electric distribution company that supplies electricity to the districts of Faisalabad, Sargodha, Mianwali, Khushab, Jhang, Bhakkar, Toba Tek Singh, and Chiniot in Pakistan. This company generates electric power from water (hydro-electric power) and distributes it to 4.01 million consumers of the area.

Faisalabad Electric Supply Company was founded in 1998. Engineer Bashir Ahmed is its current CEO.

See also

List of electric supply companies in Pakistan

References

External links
 Official website

Distribution companies of Pakistan
Government-owned companies of Pakistan
Companies based in Faisalabad
Energy in Punjab, Pakistan
Pakistani companies established in 1998
Energy companies established in 1998